The 2016 Aviva Women's Tour was the third staging of The Women's Tour, a women's stage race held in the United Kingdom. It took place between 15 and 19 June 2016 and is part of the UCI Women's World Tour.

The race was won by reigning World Champion Lizzie Armitstead. The 2015 champion, Lisa Brennauer, withdrew on the last stage, while 2014 champion Marianne Vos won the points category and finished fourth overall.

Schedule

Results

Stage 1
15 June 2016 – Southwold – Norwich,

Stage 2
16 June 2016 – Atherstone – Stratford-upon-Avon,

Stage 3
17 June 2016 – Ashbourne – Chesterfield,

Stage 4
18 June 2016 – Nottingham – Stoke-on-Trent,

Stage 5
19 June 2016 – Northampton – Kettering,

Classification leadership

References

External links

Women's Tour
Women's Tour
The Women's Tour
Women's Tour